Pasarlapudi  is the river delta of the Godavari River at the Bay of Bengal in southeastern India. It is located in the Konaseema district of Andhra Pradesh state, in the South India Region.

The Pasarlapudi village is known for its scenic vegetation, and is one of the three important Ferry points for Bodasakurru-Pasarlapudi and the other two being; Kotipalli-Mukteswaram and Sakhinetipalli-Narasapuram in the Konaseema region.

Resources
The west bank of the Godavari River in the delta is one a fertile region in the area, and is also known as Konaseema. It supports Coconut tree and Mango plantations, and rice paddies.
Many gas and oil wells are located in Pasarlapudi and its surrounding villages. They use pipelines to a GCS (gas collecting station) at Tatipaka, from there ONGC is supplying gas to the NFCL and other power plants.

See also
Pasarlapudi blowout
Coastline of Andhra Pradesh
Coromandal Coast
Geography of Andhra Pradesh

References

Godavari River
Bay of Bengal
River deltas of Asia
Landforms of Andhra Pradesh
Godavari basin
Villages in Mamidikuduru mandal